The 2001 Major League Soccer season was the sixth season of Major League Soccer. It was also the 89th season of FIFA-sanctioned soccer in the United States, and the 23rd with a national first-division league. The season was shortened due to the September 11 attacks, with the final weeks' regular season matches being canceled.

With 19 goals from Alex Pineda Chacon, Miami Fusion F.C. won their first Supporters' Shield. Tampa Bay Mutiny had the fewest wins in a season in MLS history to date with just four. San Jose Earthquakes knocked out Fusion in the MLS Cup semifinal stage and beat Los Angeles Galaxy in the final to win their first MLS Cup.

Following the end of the season, MLS announced in January 2002 that it had decided to cease the two Florida franchises, Fusion and the Mutiny. Both teams were withdrawn from the league, ceased operations and folded.

Standings

Top eight teams with the highest points per game clinch playoff berth, regardless of division.
Miami Fusion F.C. wins first tiebreaker with Chicago Fire (2-0 in head-to-head competition)
Columbus Crew wins first tiebreaker with San Jose Earthquakes (1-0-1 in head-to-head competition)
Season shortened due to September 11 attacks. Due to the different number of games played, playoff ordering determined by points per game, instead of total points.
Dallas Burn (1.35 ppg) finishes ahead of Kansas City Wizards (1.33 ppg) in points per game

MLS Cup Playoffs

Playoff Bracket

Points systemWin = 3 Pts.Loss = 0 Pts.Draw = 1 Pt.
ASDET*=Added Sudden Death Extra Time (Game tie breaker)SDET**=Sudden Death Extra Time (Series tie breaker)Teams will advance at 5 points.

Quarterfinals

Chicago Fire advance 7–1 on points.

Miami Fusion advance 6–3 on points.

Los Angeles Galaxy advance 1-0 in series overtime (SDET) after 4-4 tie on points.

San Jose Earthquakes advance 6–0 on points.

Semifinals

Los Angeles Galaxy advance 7–1 on points.

San Jose Earthquakes advance 6–3 on points.

MLS Cup

San Jose Earthquakes earns MLS berth to 2002 CONCACAF Champions' Cup.

Player awards

Player statistics

Top goal scorers

Played for more than one team - Most Recent Team Listed*

Attendance

International Competition

CONCACAF Champions' Cup

Kansas City Wizards2001 edition canceled; Wizards advanced to CONCACAF Champions' Cup 2002.
Chicago Fire2001 edition canceled; Fire advance to CONCACAF Champions' Cup 2002.

Copa Merconorte

MetroStarsWent 3-3-0 in group stage and did not advance.Defeated  Deportivo Italchacao, 2-0 at home.Awarded two forfeit wins against  Club Deportivo Guadalajara, after the club refused to travel.Lost  Deportivo Italchacao, 2-1 away.Lost  Millonarios, 2-1 away and 1-0 at home.
Kansas City WizardsWent 1-4-1 in group stage and did not advance.Defeated  Barcelona, 3-2 away, Drew 1-1 at home.Lost  Santos Laguna, 4-2 away and 1-0 at home.Lost  Sporting Cristal, 2-1 at home and 2-1 away.

CONCACAF Giants Cup

D.C. UnitedDefeated  Arnett Gardens, 5-1 on aggregate in quarterfinals.Defeated  Comunicaciones, 2-1 in semifinals.Lost  Club América, 2-0 in final.
Columbus CrewLost  Deportivo Saprissa, 3-1 on aggregate in quarterfinals.

References

External links
MLS Site 

 
2001
1
Association football events curtailed due to the September 11 attacks